The 2016–17 N1 League was the ninth season of the N1 League and the first year the competition was branded as N1 League. Seven clubs participated in the competition following a two-season hiatus. The teams played in an unknown length regular season that began on 29 October 2016 and ended on 19 February 2017.

The top four clubs based on their regular season standings qualified for the Final Four segment of the tournament, which determined the champion of the season. The semifinals were played in a two-leg aggregate series, while the championship round was played in a best two-of-three series.

Defending champions, Highlights won the title, winning the series 2-0 against Youths of the Future in the final. It was Highlights' fifth Nevisian title.

Teams 

 Bath United
 Bronx United
 Hardtimes
 Highlights
 Stoney Grove Strikers
 Villa International United
 Youths of the Future

Table 

This was the last reported table on 13 December 2016.

 1.SLH Highlights International          6   5  1  0  18- 0  16
 2.Youths of the Future                  6   3  1  2  10- 6  10
 3.CCC Bath United                       5   3  0  2  20-12   9
 4.BG Stoney Grove Strikers              5   2  2  1   9- 3   8
 5. Hardtimes                             5   2  1  2  17-10   7
 6.Bronx United                          5   0  1  4   6-28   1
 7.Villa International United            4   0  0  4   1-21   0

Final four

Bracket

See also 
2016–17 SKNFA Super League

References 

1, Nevis
Nevis
N1 League seasons